Rampage Mountain is a summit in Flathead County, Montana, in the United States. It is situated within Glacier National Park.

Climate 
According to the Köppen climate classification system, Rampage Mountain is located in an alpine subarctic climate zone with long, cold, snowy winters, and cool to warm summers. Winter temperatures can drop below −10 °F with wind chill factors below −30 °F. Due to its altitude, it receives precipitation all year, as snow in winter, and as thunderstorms in summer. Precipitation runoff from the mountain drains into tributaries of Middle Fork Flathead River. This climate supports a Lodgepole pine forest on its lower slopes.

See also
 Mountains and mountain ranges of Glacier National Park (U.S.)
 Geology of the Rocky Mountains

References

External links
 Weather: Rampage Mountain

Mountains of Flathead County, Montana
Mountains of Glacier National Park (U.S.)
Lewis Range
Mountains of Montana
North American 2000 m summits